32nd Army may refer to:

32nd Army Air & Missile Defense Command, a unit of the United States Army
32nd Army Tank Brigade (United Kingdom)
32nd Army (Soviet Union)
Thirty-Second Army (Japan), a unit of the Imperial Japanese Army